Gwyddelwern railway station was a station in Gwyddelwern, Denbighshire, Wales. The station was opened on 1 March 1863, closed to passengers on 2 February 1953 and closed completely on 2 December 1957. Nothing remains of the station today and the site is occupied by a sawmill.

References

Further reading

Disused railway stations in Denbighshire
Railway stations in Great Britain opened in 1863
Railway stations in Great Britain closed in 1957
Former London and North Western Railway stations